The following lists events that happened during 1806 in Australia.

Incumbents
Monarch - George III

Governors
Governors of the Australian colonies:
Governor of New South Wales – Captain Philip King (until 12 August), then Captain William Bligh
Lieutenant-Governor of Southern Van Diemen's Land – David Collins
Lieutenant-Governor of Northern Van Diemen's Land – William Paterson

Events
5 August – Captain William Bligh arrives in Sydney to take over the governorship.
 12 August – Governor King boards HMS Buffalo for his return to England, and Bligh's commission is formally read.

Exploration and settlement
Governor King estimated that 280 men were employed along the Australian coast in sealing and fishing.
Matthew Flinders completes the first circumnavigation of the continent.

References

 
Australia
Years of the 19th century in Australia